"Marchin On" is a song by American rock band OneRepublic, and is written and produced by frontman Ryan Tedder for the group's second studio album Waking Up (2009). Producer and rapper Timbaland included a remixed version of the song for his third studio album Shock Value II (2009). As the title of the song is "Marchin On" it has a marching beat with a bass drum which is a good foundation for an electronic remix.

The track was released as the album's third single in German-speaking Europe in June 2010, where it served as German TV channel ZDF's promotional FIFA 2010 World Cup song and it was also used by HBO to promote their 2012 programming line up. The song was used in the episode 20 ("Blood Brothers") of season one of The CW series The Vampire Diaries.

Originally, the song "Good Life" was supposed to serve as the third single, but due to "Marchin On" being selected for FIFA, "Good Life" had to be pushed back to being the fourth single.

Track listing
CD single/Digital download
 "Marchin On" (Patriot remix) – 4:15
 "Marchin On" (OneRepublic & Timbaland) (Timbo version) – 4:12

Music video
The music video features the Patriot Remix.  It shows the band dancing and playing different instruments; Drew Brown playing guitar, Eddie Fisher playing drums and a marching bass drum, Brent Kutzle playing a marching snare drum, Zach Filkins playing a synthesizer and shaker, and Ryan Tedder singing and playing the piano and tambourine. In the background of the video, special effects lighting appears, which gives the video a club vibe. The music video currently has over 34 million views.

Charts

Weekly charts

Year-end charts

Certifications

References

External links
 Official Website

2010 singles
OneRepublic songs
Songs written by Ryan Tedder
Interscope Records singles
Mosley Music Group singles
Song recordings produced by Ryan Tedder
2009 songs